Michael Gardener (born August 27, 1981) is an American former professional basketball player for the Akita Northern Happinets of the Japanese bj league.

College statistics

|-
| style="text-align:left;"| 2001–02
| style="text-align:left;"| Texas A&M
|14 ||11  || 24.1 ||.323 ||.190  || .667 ||2.5  ||2.6 || 1.2 ||0.0  ||6.9
|-
| style="text-align:left;"| 2002–03
| style="text-align:left;"| SE Louisiana
|22 || 8 || 22.0 ||.279 || .231 ||.515|| 2.50 ||3.32 || 0.95 || 0.05 || 3.36
|-
| style="text-align:left;"| 2003–04
| style="text-align:left;"|SE Louisiana
|28  || 28 || 34.0 ||.442 ||.388  ||.733||3.18  ||5.00 || 1.46 || 0.07 || 13.93
|-
|- class="sortbottom"
! style="text-align:center;" colspan=2|  Career

!65 ||48 || 27.9 ||.397 || .323 ||.689  || 2.8 ||3.9  || 1.2 ||0.0  ||8.9
|-

Career statistics 

|-
| align="left" |  2007–08
| align="left" | Fukuoka
| 42 ||  || 31.8 || .404 || .313 || .607 || 4.9 || 4.9 || 2.1 || 0.0 ||  18.4
|-
| align="left" | 2008–09
| align="left" | Hamamatsu
| 52 || 52 || 32.5 || .411 || .344 || .730 || 5.4 ||  bgcolor="CFECEC"|6.5 || 2.3 || 0.1 ||25.5
|-
| align="left" |  2009–10
| align="left" | Takamatsu
| 44 || 42 || 36.7 || .369 || .290 || .669 || 5.6 ||  bgcolor="CFECEC"|7.0 || 1.7 || 0.1 ||  21.3
|-
| align="left" |  2010–11
| align="left" | Cuxhaven
| 3 ||  || 30.7 || .432 || .467 || .692 || 2.7 || 4.0 || 0.7 || 0.3 ||  16.0
|-
| align="left" |  2011–12
| align="left" | Akita
| 16 || 16 || 31 || .459 || .308 || .736 || 5.8 || 5.6 || 1.7 || 0 || 19.4
|-

References

1981 births
Living people
Akita Northern Happinets players
American expatriate basketball people in Japan
American expatriate basketball people in New Zealand
Basketball players from Michigan
Canterbury Rams players
Kagawa Five Arrows players
Rizing Zephyr Fukuoka players
San-en NeoPhoenix players
Southeastern Louisiana Lions basketball players
Texas A&M Aggies men's basketball players
American men's basketball players
Guards (basketball)